People with the surname Doud:
 Chuck Doud, video game music composer
 Mamie Eisenhower, whose maiden name was Doud
 Jacqueline Powers Doud, president of Mount St. Mary's College
 Reuben G. Doud, American politician
 Ruby Archer Doud, American poet

See also
 Douds (disambiguation)